Maryland Route 422 (MD 422) is a state highway in the U.S. state of Maryland. Known as Bayard Road, the highway runs  from Polling House Road near Lothian east to MD 2 and MD 408 at Lothian in southern Anne Arundel County. MD 422 was constructed in the late 1920s.

Route description

MD 422 begins at Polling House Road west of Lothian. Bayard Road continues west as a county highway through the hamlet of Bayard to Sands Road, which parallels the Patuxent River. MD 422 heads east as a two-lane undivided road through farmland. After passing South Polling House Road, which meets Polling House Road in Harwood, the highway turns southeast toward its terminus at a four-legged roundabout in the village of Lothian. MD 2 (Solomons Island Road) heads southeast toward Prince Frederick and northeast in the direction of Annapolis; MD 408 (Mount Zion-Marlboro Road) heads southwest toward Upper Marlboro.

History
MD 422 was constructed as a gravel road in 1929 and 1930 from Polling House Road to Lothian, which was previously known as Mount Zion. The Lothian roundabout was installed in 1995.

Junction list

See also

References

External links 

 MDRoads: MD 422

422
Maryland Route 422